Aambung  is a market center in Myanglung Municipality in the Himalayas of Terhathum District in Province No. 1 of eastern Nepal. Formerly a Village Development Committee this place was merged to form the new municipality since 18 May 2014. At the time of the 1991 Nepal census it had a population of 3309 people living in 588 individual households. It is really an awesome place with very friendly residents.

References

External links
UN map of the municipalities of Terhathum District

Populated places in Tehrathum District